Alexander Ivanovich Shkurko (4 November 1937 – 10 April 2022) was a Russian historian and politician. He served as president of the State Historical Museum from 1992 to 2010. He died in Moscow on 10 April 2022, at the age of 84.

References

1937 births
2022 deaths
Writers from Kharkiv
Soviet historians
20th-century Russian historians
Russian politicians
Russian people of Ukrainian descent
Communist Party of the Soviet Union members
Recipients of the Order "For Merit to the Fatherland", 3rd class
Recipients of the Order "For Merit to the Fatherland", 4th class
Recipients of the Order of Honour (Russia)
Recipients of the Order of Friendship of Peoples
Officiers of the Légion d'honneur
Commanders of the Order of the Polar Star
Recipients of the Order of Merit (Ukraine), 3rd class
21st-century Russian historians
Politicians from Kharkiv